Chad Timberlake (born January 1, 1984) is an American basketball coach and player. Currently, he is an assistant coach with Union Neuchâtel of the Swiss Basketball League. He played college basketball for the Fairleigh Dickinson Knights, where in 2006 he was named the Northeast Conference Player of the Year.

College career
Born in Wiesbaden, Germany, Timberlake came to Fairleigh Dickinson from New Utrecht High School in Brooklyn. In his first season he came off the bench to average 6.2 points and 2.7 assists per game, earning Northeast Conference All-Rookie team honors. He moved into the starting lineup for his remaining three years, helping lead the team to an NCAA Tournament berth as a junior. He earned NEC Player of the Year unanimously as a senior during the 2005–06 season after averaging 15.2 points, 5.5 rebounds and 4.7 assists per game and leading the Knights to a conference regular season championship.

Professional career
Timberlake was not drafted in the 2006 NBA draft. He has played professionally in several countries before settling in Switzerland since 2016. He signed with BBC Monthey of the Swiss Basketball League after stints with Lions de Genève and Fribourg Olympic.

Coaching career
In August 2021, immediately after his retirement, Timberlake signed as assistant coach of Union Neuchâtel.

References

External links
Swiss Basketball League profile
Fairleigh Dickinson Knights bio
College stats @ basketball-reference.com

1984 births
Living people
Albany Patroons players
American expatriate basketball people in Bulgaria
American expatriate basketball people in Germany
American expatriate basketball people in Hungary
American expatriate basketball people in Israel
American expatriate basketball people in Poland
American expatriate basketball people in Switzerland
American men's basketball players
American basketball coaches
Basketball players from New York City
BBC Monthey players
Crailsheim Merlins players
Elitzur Yavne B.C. players
Fairleigh Dickinson Knights men's basketball players
Falco KC Szombathely players
Fribourg Olympic players
Lions de Genève players
Mitteldeutscher BC players
New Utrecht High School alumni
PBC Academic players
Shooting guards
Sportspeople from Brooklyn
Sportspeople from Wiesbaden